Juan Felipe Gomez (born June 7, 1977) is a retired Colombian Racquetball player. Gomez won gold at the 1995 South American Championship  in Men's Singles. He was ranked Colombian #1 player for a decade, from 1992 to 2002. Gomez was also Junior National Champion and doubles National Champion representing Colombia in various IRF - International Racquetball Federation events such as South American and Pan American Games and the World Racquetball Championships.

Medal record / Men's racquetball Representing Colombia 

World Championships;  Quarter Finals - Singles 1998

Pan American Championships;  Semi Final - Singles 1996

South American Championships;  Gold Medal - 1995 and Silver Medal - 1993

Bolivarian Games;  Silver medal – 1993

World Junior Championships;  Semi Final - Singles 14 & under - 1992

External links

https://www.eltiempo.com/amp/archivo/documento/MAM-633963

https://www.eltiempo.com/amp/archivo/documento/MAM-323513

http://lindamojer.com/04web_bkup/racqmag/newsline/events03/03panam1.htm

https://loaizal59.files.wordpress.com/2014/03/boletc3adn-santiago-2014-no-004-3-de-marzo.pdf

https://www.eltiempo.com/amp/archivo/documento/MAM-113057

http://www.coc.org.co/all-news/historia-xiii-juegos-boliavarianos-santa-cruz-1993-alejandro-bermudez-la-figura/

https://www.teamusa.org/-/media/USA_Racquetball/Documents/Magazine/1993/1993julyaug.pdf?la=en&hash=BF40EB318E33C452968123AB1B1A6D512C4365E7

http://lindamojer.com/04web_bkup/racqmag/newsline/events03/03panam2.htm https://www.eltiempo.com/amp/archivo/documento/MAM-252176 https://www.eltiempo.com/amp/archivo/documento/MAM-654299

https://www.eltiempo.com/amp/archivo/documento/MAM-444556

References 

1977 births
Living people
Colombian racquetball players